Mitenskoye is a rural locality (a village) in Vysokovskoye Rural Settlement, Ust-Kubinsky District, Vologda Oblast, Russia. The population was 131 as of 2002. There are 4 streets.

Geography 
Mitenskoye is located 15 km southeast of Ustye (the district's administrative centre) by road. Lavy is the nearest rural locality.

References 

Rural localities in Ust-Kubinsky District